The 2016 Calderdale Metropolitan Borough Council election took place on 5 May 2016 to elect members of Calderdale Metropolitan Borough Council in England. This was on the same day as other local elections. One councillor was elected in each ward for a four-year term so the councillors elected in 2016 last stood for election in 2012. Each ward is represented by three councillors, the election of which is staggered, so only one third of the councillors was elected in this election. Before the election there was no overall control with a minority Labour administration. After the election there was still no overall control so the minority Labour administration continued.

In July 2016 Councillor Rob Holden of Ryburn Ward was suspended from the Conservative Party after he made a request for an independent financial audit of the Calder Valley Conservative Association. This led to a criminal investigation into the financial irregularities at the association. He retained his seat on the council as an independent.

A by-election was held on 6 April 2017 in the Hipperholme and Lightcliffe ward after the sudden death of Councillor Graham Hall in January 2017. The seat was held by the Conservative Party with George Robinson winning the seat.

By-elections were held on 8 June 2017 in the Rastrick ward and Todmorden ward after the resignation of Rastrick Councillor Lynne Mitchell and Todmorden Councillor Jayne Booth. Rastrick ward was held by the Conservative Party with the election of Sophie Whittaker and Todmorden ward was held by the Labour Party with the election of Carol Machell.

In April 2018 Councillor Mike Payne of Sowerby Bridge Ward was suspended from the Conservative Party pending an investigation by the party after it was discovered that he had shared an article on Twitter in 2013 which called Muslims "parasites". He was not investigated by Calderdale Council as he was not a councillor at the time of the Tweets. He retained his seat on the council as an independent Conservative. He was later reinstated into the party.

Council results

Council Composition
Prior to the election the composition of the council was:

After the election the composition of the council was:

Ward results
The list of persons nominated were announced by the council once they closed on 7 April 2016. The ward results listed below are based on the changes from the last time this third was up for election, in the 2012 elections, not taking into account any mid-term by-elections or party defections.

Brighouse ward

The incumbent was Ann Martin for the Labour Party.

Calder ward

The incumbent was Janet Battye for the Liberal Democrats.

Elland ward

The incumbent was Pat Allen for the Liberal Democrats.
The swing is expressed between the Liberal Democrats & Labour as Labour was second in 2012.

Greetland & Stainland ward

The incumbent was Malcolm James for the Liberal Democrats who stood down at this election.

Hipperholme & Lightcliffe ward

The incumbent was Graham Hall for the Conservative Party.
Second place in 2012 was an independent, so the swing which is expressed between Conservative & Labour is significantly increased by the Conservatives regaining the votes which went to the independent in 2012.

Illingworth & Mixenden ward

The incumbent was Lisa Lambert for the Labour Party.
The swing is between Labour & Conservative. Second place in 2012 was an Ex-BNP councillor and no BNP candidate stood in 2016.

Luddendenfoot ward

The incumbent was Simon Young for the Labour Party who stood down at this election.
The swing is expressed between Labour & Conservative although the Liberal Democrats were second in 2012.

Northowram & Shelf ward

The incumbent was Peter Caffrey for the Conservative party.

Ovenden ward

The incumbent was Anne Collins for the Labour Party.

Park ward

The incumbent was Jenny Lynn for the Labour Party.

Rastrick ward

The incumbent was Ann McAllister for the Conservative Party who stood down at this election.

Ryburn ward

The incumbent was Geraldine Carter for the Conservative Party. The swing is expressed between Conservative & Labour presuming the independent candidate has taken votes from both sides and by increasing turnout.

Skircoat ward

The incumbent was John Hardy for the Conservative Party.
The swing is expressed from Labour to Conservative though the more significant swing is 12.5% from Liberal Democrat (who were second in 2012) to Labour.

Sowerby Bridge ward

The incumbent was Adam Wilkinson for the Labour Party.
The biggest swing was 9.5% from Conservative to UKIP.

Todmorden ward

The incumbent was Steve Sweeney for the Labour Party.
The swing is expressed between Labour and the Liberal Democrats who were second in 2012. The swing between Labour and Conservative was 3.9% towards Labour. The National Front percentage change is listed as +2.2% as there was no National Front candidate in 2012, it is by comparison 6.2% down compared to the showing of another far-right party The British Peoples Party in 2012.

Town ward

The incumbent was Megan Swift for the Labour Party.
The swing is shown as 19.2% from Labour to UKIP who did not stand in 2012. The swing between Labour & Conservatives who were second in 2012 is 5.2% from Labour to Conservative.

Warley ward

The incumbent was Martin Burton for the Labour Party who stood down at this election.

By-elections between 2016 and 2018

Hipperholme and Lightcliffe ward, 2017

Rastrick ward, 2017

Todmorden ward, 2017

References

2016 English local elections
2016
2010s in West Yorkshire